Ionize is a free multilingual Content Management System based on CodeIgniter written in PHP. It was developed by a group of webdesigners and is aimed to be highly flexible and modular, yet easy to use for end users. It requires a working Apache and MySQL installation.

See also 
 List of content management systems

External links 
 Official Webpage with documentation
 Github Repository

Content management systems